The election for Resident Commissioner of Puerto Rico to the United States House of Representatives was held on November 8, 2016.

The Resident Commissioner of Puerto Rico is the only member of the United States House of Representatives who is elected every four years instead of a two-year term. The Resident Commissioner and Gubernatorial candidates run together as a ticket, like a Governor/Lieutenant Governor ticket would run in the other states, but there are still separate general elections for each position.

Election results

See also 
United States House of Representatives elections, 2016
Puerto Rican general election, 2016

References 

2016 Puerto Rico elections
Puerto Rico
2016